Joan Shawlee (March 5, 1926 – March 22, 1987), nee Joan Fulton (and also credited sometimes under that name, such as in the film noir Woman on the Run (1950), was an American film and television actress. She is known for her recurring role as "Pickles" in The Dick Van Dyke Show, a career-defining turn in Billy Wilder's comedy titled Some Like It Hot (1959) playing  Sweet Sue, the abrasive martinet in charge of Marilyn Monroe's all-girl jazz band, and as the flamboyant Madame Pompey in the 1957 Maverick episode "Stampede" with James Garner.

Early years
Shawlee was born in Forest Hills, New York to Thomas Cuyler Fulton, an automobile salesman, and Esther L. Ring Fulton, and she moved with her parents and two brothers Theodore Cuyler Fulton Jr and Albert Fulton to Vancouver when she was five years old.

Career

Dancing and modeling 
Shawlee studied ballet under Ernest Belcher. At the age of fourteen, she began to work as a model for the John Robert Powers agency in New York, and worked later as a showgirl on Broadway. Billed as Joyce Ring, she appeared in the musical productions By Jupiter (1942) and A Connecticut Yankee (1943).

Film 
A tall woman (5'9"), she was known for small parts in Jack Lemmon and Billy Wilder films. She is probably best remembered for her role as bandleader Sweet Sue in Some Like It Hot (1959) starring Marilyn Monroe, Tony Curtis, and Lemmon. She appeared as Sylvia in The Apartment (1960), and as Amazon Annie in Irma la Douce, both of which starred Lemmon and Shirley MacLaine. She also appeared in Wilder's final film, Buddy Buddy (1981).

Television 
Shawlee had a recurring role on TV in The Dick Van Dyke Show as Fiona "Pickles" Sorrell, wife of writer Maurice "Buddy" Sorrell (Morey Amsterdam). She played the lead in The Adventures of Aggie (1956–57), which ran for only one season. She played Lorna Peterson on Betty Hutton's short-lived series Goldie; Margo on the 1976–77 crime drama The Feather and Father Gang; and Tessie on Joe's World. She was also a regular on The Abbott and Costello Show. She played a dead criminal's wife in Stories of the Century with Jim Davis and a 1957 episode of Maverick titled "Stampede", starring James Garner and Efrem Zimbalist Jr., in which she portrayed the exuberant Madame Pompey. Her final acting appearance was in an episode of Crazy Like a Fox in 1985.

Comedy team
In the early 1960s, Shawlee and actress Mitzi McCall teamed up as a night club act. They opened at the Club Robaire in Cleveland. In January 1961, syndicated newspaper columnist Dorothy Kilgallen reported that the team was "causing quite a stir", while drawing attention to -- and exaggerating -- their discrepancy in height: "Joan being six feet, three inches tall and Mitzi four feet, 10 inches short."

Personal life
She was married twice. Her first husband was Walter Shawlee, a printing executive. They had a son, Walter, and divorced in 1956. Her second husband, Eddie Barchet, was a resort hotel manager she met in England and with whom she lived in California. She and Barchet had a daughter, Angela.

Shawlee was a Democrat who was supportive of Adlai Stevenson's campaign during the 1952 presidential election. Shawlee was a practicing Episcopalian.

Death
Shawlee died of breast cancer, in Hollywood, California, on March 22, 1987, aged 61. She was cremated and her ashes scattered at sea.

Selected filmography and television

Men in Her Diary (1945) - Courtroom Spectator (uncredited)
This Love of Ours (1945) - Chorus Girl (uncredited)
Frontier Gal (1945) - Hostess (uncredited)
Because of Him (1946) - Autograph Seeker 
Idea Girl (1946) - Mabel
Tangier (1946) - Rocco's Blonde
House of Horrors (1946) - Stella McNally
Cuban Pete (1946) - Ann
The Runaround (1946) - Mamie 'Baby' Willis
Inside Job (1946) - Ruth
Lover Come Back (1946) - Janie
White Tie and Tails (1946) - Virgie
I'll Be Yours (1947) - Blonde
The Michigan Kid (1947) - Soubrette
Song of Scheherazade (1947) - French Girl (uncredited)
Buck Privates Come Home (1947) - Sylvia Hunter
The Vigilantes Return (1947) - Ben's Girl
Woman on the Run (1950) - Tipsy Woman at Bar
Prehistoric Women (1950) - Lotee
Two Tickets to Broadway (1951) - Tall Brunette in Boardinghouse (uncredited)
The Marrying Kind (1952) - Tall Party Dancer / Woman at Airport (uncredited)
Sound Off (1952) - Showgirl (uncredited)
Something for the Birds (1952) - Woman in Subway Station (uncredited)
Because of You (1952) - Autograph Seeker (uncredited)
All Ashore (1953) - Hedy
Loose in London (1953) - Tall Girl at Party (uncredited)
From Here to Eternity (1953) - Sandra (uncredited)
The Adventures of Ozzie and Harriet (1953, TV Series) - Marion / The Registrar
Pride of the Blue Grass (1954) - Mrs. Casey
Casanova's Big Night (1954) - Beatrice D'Brizzi (uncredited)
About Mrs. Leslie (1954) - Jill - Nightclub Girl
Francis Joins the WACS (1954) - Sgt. Kipp
A Star Is Born (1954) - Joan (uncredited)
Bowery to Bagdad (1955) - Velma 'Cindy Lou' Calhoun
Conquest of Space (1955) - Rosie McCann
Born for Trouble (1955)
The Adventures of Aggie (1956–1957, TV Series) - Aggie
A Farewell to Arms (1957) - Blonde Nurse (uncredited)
 Maverick (1957, Season 1: Episode 9 “Stampede”)
 Zorro (1958, Season 1: Episode 18 "Zorro Fights His Father," Episode 19 "Death Stacks the Deck") - Barmaid ClaraSome Like It Hot (1959) - Sweet SueThe Apartment (1960) - SylviaThe Rifleman (1961, TV Series) - Mary WoodsonThe Dick Van Dyke Show (1963, TV Series) - Pickles SorrellCritic's Choice (1963) - Marge OrrIrma la Douce (1963) - Amazon AnnieGuerillas in Pink Lace (1964) - Miss Gloria MaxineThe Wild Angels (1966) - Momma MonahanThe Reluctant Astronaut (1967) - Blonde in BarThe St. Valentine's Day Massacre (1967) - Edna, Frank's Girlfriend (uncredited)Tony Rome (1967) - Fat CandyLive A Little Love A Little (1968) - Robbie's MotherOne More Train to Rob (1971) - Big NellieWillard (1971) - AliceColumbo (1971, season 1 episode "Suitable for Framing") - MitildaFlash and the Firecat (1975) - RoseFarewell, My Lovely (1975) - Garrulous Woman in Dance HallThe Feather and Father Gang (1976–1977, TV Series) - MargoLongshot (1981) - Motel ManagerBuddy Buddy (1981) - ReceptionistKiss My Grits (1982) - WandaCity Heat'' (1984) - Peggy Barker

References

External links
 

1926 births
1987 deaths
20th-century American actresses
Actresses from New York City
American film actresses
American television actresses
Deaths from breast cancer
Deaths from cancer in California
People from Forest Hills, Queens
New York (state) Democrats
California Democrats
American Episcopalians